Barabash is a surname. Notable people with the surname include:

Yakiv Barabash, Zaporozhian Cossack ataman (1657–58)
Uri Barbash, Israeli film director
Tatyana Barabash, Soviet/Russian speed skater

See also
Barabash (rural locality), a rural locality (a selo) in Primorsky Krai, Russia
Barabas